Gerald G. Byrne (September 12, 1890 – January 25, 1952) was a politician in Newfoundland. He represented St. John's City East in the Newfoundland House of Assembly from 1928 to 1934.

He was born in St. John's, Newfoundland and Labrador and was educated at Saint Bonaventure's College. He was one of the so-called "First Five Hundred" to enlist in the Royal Newfoundland Regiment at the start of World War I. Byrne saw action during the Gallipoli Campaign, was injured at Beaumont Hamel in 1916 and was sent back to Newfoundland in 1917. He became military secretary for the Department of Militia. He was elected to the Newfoundland assembly in 1928 and was reelected in 1932.

He died in St. John's at the age of 61.

References 

1890 births
1952 deaths
Politicians from St. John's, Newfoundland and Labrador
Members of the Newfoundland and Labrador House of Assembly
Dominion of Newfoundland politicians
Newfoundland military personnel of World War I
Royal Newfoundland Regiment soldiers